Pont d'Engordany  is a bridge located in Escaldes-Engordany Parish, Andorra. It is a heritage property registered in the Cultural Heritage of Andorra. It was built in 1785.

References

Escaldes-Engordany
Bridges in Andorra
Cultural Heritage of Andorra
Bridges completed in 1785